SS Tiger Hill was a cargo ship that was one of the major vessels involved in the Aliyah Bet movement.

Early History
The Tiger Hill, a 1,481-ton ship, was built in 1887 by Archibald McMillan & Son Ltd., Dumbarton, Scotland. The cargo vessel was originally built for the Panhellenic Steamship Co. (Navigation a Vapeur Panhéllenique) of Piraeus, Greece and sailed as the SS Thrace in the period 1887-1910. It then went through various names and owners until it was renamed as the SS Tiger Hill and was owned by the General Steamship Company of Panama and sailed under a Panamanian flag. However the crew was Greek.

Last Voyage
The ship sailed from Constanţa, Romania on August 3, 1939 laden with between 750-800 Jewish refugees with a destination of the Palestine Mandate. The refugees were overwhelmingly of Czech, Austrian and German origin (being the three territories the Nazis then controlled) plus some from the Free City of Danzig. Hundreds of bulk beds had been assembled within the holds of the cargo ship. Passengers were allowed a maximum of 25 kgs of luggage.

The voyage was a very long one. Towards the end of the voyage the Tiger Hill rendezvoused with another Panamanian vessel, the  S.S. Frossoula off the coast of Lebanon, on  August 29, 1939, and several hundred more Jewish refugees were transshipped to the "Tiger Hill". Many of the refugees were malnourished and dysentery broke out amongst the passengers. The Frossoula (another Panamanian-flagged Greek ship) had set sail even earlier (from Sulina in Romania on 29 May 1939)  with its voyage having been organised by a few Slovakian Jews from Bratislava (working as the Black Rose organisation) with the agreement of the Nazi government.

The ship did not have approval to land therefore the passengers were technically illegal immigrants in the eyes of the British, that then controlled the Mandate.

On the 1st of September 1939 (the day that World War II began) SS Tiger Hill was intercepted and fired on by Royal Navy gunboats off Tel Aviv. Two passengers [Dr Robert Schneider and Zvi Binder] were killed when the vessel was strafed by British planes.

The vessel was run aground on Frishman Beach at Haifa. It is estimated that there were between 1,150 and 1,400 refugees aboard.

Crowds gathered on the beach and cheered as the refugees descended from the stranded ship.

Fate
The wreck was broken up in situ in 1940.

Gallery

References

Steamships
Dumbarton
1887 ships